Simpang KKA incident also known as The Dewantara Incident or Krueng Geukueh tragedy is an event during Aceh insurgency that occurred on 3 May 1999 in North Aceh, Special Region of Aceh, Indonesia which resulted in 52 people dead after the Indonesian military randomly shot at hundreds of peaceful protesters against an earlier shooting incident (30 April) at Cot Murong, Lhokseumawe.

Incident
Simpang KKA is a junction near to PT Kertas Kraft Aceh kraft paper factory at Dewantara, near the city of Lhokseumawe. On 3 May 1999, hundreds of civilians protested against the previous Indonesian military shooting at Cot Murong.

References 

 

Military history of Indonesia
Conflicts in 1999
History of Aceh
20th-century conflicts
21st-century conflicts
Insurgency in Aceh
Insurgencies in Asia
Separatism in Indonesia
Wars involving Indonesia
New Order (Indonesia)
Post-Suharto era
May 1999 events in Asia